The Jeep DJ (also known as the Dispatcher) is a two-wheel drive variant of the four-wheel drive CJ series. Production started in 1955 by Willys, which was renamed Kaiser Jeep in 1963. In 1970, American Motors Corporation (AMC) purchased Kaiser's money-losing Jeep operations and established AM General, a wholly owned subsidiary that built the DJ through 1984.

DJ-3A
The DJ-3A was introduced in 1955 for the 1956 model year. It was an inexpensive design because it used Jeep's existing tooling and technology. It used the body style of the older CJ-3A, along with the L-134 engine. Unlike the CJ-3A, it came with either a column shift or floor shift three-speed Borg-Warner T-96 manual transmission. 

It was offered with many different body options including a soft top, metal top, or a full van body. The marketing focused on it being "perfect for economical deliveries" and "for carefree business and pleasure transportation." One model was a postal delivery vehicle with the driver's position on the right side for mailbox delivery.

In early 1959, Willys introduced the Jeep Gala to the export markets and users desiring the nimble size and open bodywork, but no need for four wheel-drive. This model gained popularity as a "fun car" at resorts in Hawaii, Mexico, and islands in the Caribbean area. It was finished in pink, green, or blue and trimmed with matching white striped fabric, as well as with fringe on its top.

In fall 1959, a similar model called the Jeep Surrey was introduced in the US market. The primary target market were resort hotels and vacation centers. It also served as a low-cost rental vehicle for their guests. The Surrey came with a standard striped fabric top, as well as a matching fabric cover for what was advertised as a "Continental tire mount."

DJ-5 and DJ-6
The DJ-3A was replaced by the right hand drive DJ-5 Dispatcher 100 in 1965. It was based on the CJ-5 and used the Hurricane and Dauntless engines. A  longer wheelbase DJ-6 model was built from 1965 to 1973 alongside the CJ-6.

DJ-5A through DJ-5M

The DJ-5A was introduced in 1967, beginning the lettering system indicating changes within the series.

The DJ-5A (Kaiser Co.) used a standard CJ front end, with a four-cylinder Chevrolet Nova  engine and two-speed Powerglide automatic transmission, with a T-handle shifter located on the floor next to the driver's seat. The main body was a single unit, resembling the earlier Jeep when equipped with the metal Extreme Cold Weather Enclosure hard top.

The models used by the United States Post Office had right-hand drive (without power steering), and were built in a lighter, less durable design than the standard Jeep. These changes included the use of C-channel frame rails (as opposed to the box rails of the CJ-5) and, while the hood was the same dimensions as (and interchangeable with) the CJ, it did not have the reinforced design of the original. The standard configuration had only a driver's seat and a letter tray installed. This decreased curb weight, combined with different leaf springs than other models, allowed carrying more cargo weight behind the driver.

The metal side doors were also designed to slide open and closed, and could be locked open while driving. They were supported by ball bearings, which ran in a channel just under the rain gutter, and a plastic retainer ran in a small channel along the body. A worn, damaged or lost retainer would allow the door to swing outward, fail to engage the rubber stop on the rear bumper, and slide completely off of the channel (and the vehicle). A single, hinged rear door gave access from the floor to the bottom of the hard top, and was the width of the open area between the wheel wells. 

There were no cutouts in the body for the rear wheels, which made tire changes more difficult, as even when the frame was jacked well off the ground, the axle did not fall enough for the tire to clear the body. The DJ-5A used standard 15-inch passenger car tires, with no provision for carrying a spare. While the front bumper was of the standard CJ design (though thinner and lighter than the original), the rear bumper was a unique design, a single stamped part that ran the full width of the vehicle. At each end was a rubber stopper for the sliding doors. The 10-gallon fuel tank was under the rear body, just ahead of the bumper.

In 1971, a unique five-slot grille without turn signals that was used only on postal Jeeps was introduced. The 1971 model actually has the grille extend past the front of the hood edge. This allowed more room for the AMC Straight-6 engine and radiator. Like the DJ-5A, while resembling the CJ series, these were built as a completely enclosed, rear-wheel drive vehicle, with sliding side doors (which could be opened while driving), and a swinging rear door. Most models only had the driver's seat and a mail tray where the second seat would normally be located. One improvement over earlier Jeeps was mounting the rear springs outside of the frame rails, thus providing greater stability for the vehicle with its top-heavy enclosed cargo area, especially at highway speeds. Most models were also equipped with a limited slip differential and a heavy-duty steering gearbox. Other improvements include a vent in the roof and cut-outs around the rear tires.

AM General used a variety of powerplants during production. DJ production was ended in 1984 with the DJ-5M, which used the  AMC straight-4 engine.

DJ-5E Electruck

American Motors experimented with electric vehicles and starting in 1974 mass-produced the DJ-5E, a rear-wheel drive electric delivery van, also known as the Electruck.
 
Similar in appearance and in most of its dimensions, the DJ-5E was powered by a set of two 27-volt lead-acid batteries with a 54-volt  compound wound DC motor with electronic regulation made by Gould Electronics. The U.S. Postal Service purchased 352 vehicles for the use in cities with serious air pollution.

Model numbers
DJ-3A (1955–65):  Willys Go Devil straight-4 L-head engine, three-speed manual
DJ-5 (1965–67):  Willys Hurricane straight-4 F-head engine, three-speed manual
DJ-5A (1968–70):  Chevy Nova straight-4, two-speed Powerglide automatic
DJ-5B (1970–72):  AMC Straight-6 engine, BorgWarner T-35 three-speed automatic
DJ-5C (1973–74):  AMC Straight-6 engine, T-35 or M-11 automatic
DJ-5D (1975–76):  AMC Straight-6 engine, 727 TorqueFlite automatic
DJ-5E (1976): Electruck Electric
DJ-5F (1977–78):  or  AMC Straight-6 engine, 727 TorqueFlite automatic
DJ-5L (1982): GM Iron Duke engine  straight-4, Chrysler 904 transmission
DJ-5M (1983–84):  AMC straight-4 engine, Chrysler 904 transmission

See also

References

External links

Jeep DJ - Postal Jeep Facebook community
Postal Jeep Homepage
Jeep Engine Specs
The Dispatcher Jeeps page

DJ
Electric vehicles introduced in the 20th century
Vehicles introduced in 1955
1950s cars
1960s cars
1970s cars
1980s cars
Kaiser Motors
Willys vehicles
Motor vehicles manufactured in the United States
United States Postal Service
Rear-wheel-drive vehicles
Production electric cars
Electric car models